General elections were held on the Isle of Man on 29 September 2011 to elect 24 members to the island's lower house, the House of Keys. 60,000 residents were eligible to vote, including 16- and 17-year-olds. Successful candidates were sworn in on 4 October 2011. A total of about 34,000 people voted in the elections, some of whom were in multi-member constituencies and cast more than one vote.

Results

By constituency
{| class="wikitable" 
|+ Ayre; 1 return
|-
! scope="col" colspan=2 rowspan=2 style="width:12em;"       | Party
! scope="col" rowspan=2           style="width:14em;"       | Candidate
! scope="col" colspan=2                                     | Votes
|-
! scope="col"                     style="padding: 0 0.6em;" | Count
! scope="col"                                               | Of total (%)

{| class="wikitable" 
|+ Castletown; 1 return
|-
! scope="col" colspan=2 rowspan=2 style="width:12em;"       | Party
! scope="col" rowspan=2           style="width:14em;"       | Candidate
! scope="col" colspan=2                                     | Votes
|-
! scope="col"                     style="padding: 0 0.6em;" | Count
! scope="col"                                               | Of total (%)

{| class="wikitable" 
|+ Douglas East; 2 returns
|-
! scope="col" colspan=2 rowspan=2 style="width:12em;"       | Party
! scope="col" rowspan=2           style="width:14em;"       | Candidate
! scope="col" colspan=2                                     | Votes
|-
! scope="col"                     style="padding: 0 0.6em;" | Count
! scope="col"                                               | Of total (%)

{| class="wikitable" 
|+ Douglas North; 2 returns
|-
! scope="col" colspan=2 rowspan=2 style="width:12em;"       | Party
! scope="col" rowspan=2           style="width:14em;"       | Candidate
! scope="col" colspan=2                                     | Votes
|-
! scope="col"                     style="padding: 0 0.6em;" | Count
! scope="col"                                               | Of total (%)

{| class="wikitable" 
|+ Douglas South; 2 returns
|-
! scope="col" colspan=2 rowspan=2 style="width:12em;"       | Party
! scope="col" rowspan=2           style="width:14em;"       | Candidate
! scope="col" colspan=2                                     | Votes
|-
! scope="col"                     style="padding: 0 0.6em;" | Count
! scope="col"                                               | Of total (%)

{| class="wikitable" 
|+ Douglas West; 2 returns
|-
! scope="col" colspan=2 rowspan=2 style="width:12em;"       | Party
! scope="col" rowspan=2           style="width:14em;"       | Candidate
! scope="col" colspan=2                                     | Votes
|-
! scope="col"                     style="padding: 0 0.6em;" | Count
! scope="col"                                               | Of total (%)

{| class="wikitable" 
|+ Garff; 1 return
|-
! scope="col" colspan=2 rowspan=2 style="width:12em;"       | Party
! scope="col" rowspan=2           style="width:14em;"       | Candidate
! scope="col" colspan=2                                     | Votes
|-
! scope="col"                     style="padding: 0 0.6em;" | Count
! scope="col"                                               | Of total (%)

{| class="wikitable" 
|+ Glenfaba; 1 return
|-
! scope="col" colspan=2 rowspan=2 style="width:12em;"       | Party
! scope="col" rowspan=2           style="width:14em;"       | Candidate
! scope="col" colspan=2                                     | Votes
|-
! scope="col"                     style="padding: 0 0.6em;" | Count
! scope="col"                                               | Of total (%)

{| class="wikitable" 
|+ Malew & Santon; 1 return
|-
! scope="col" colspan=2 rowspan=2 style="width:12em;"       | Party
! scope="col" rowspan=2           style="width:14em;"       | Candidate
! scope="col" colspan=2                                     | Votes
|-
! scope="col"                     style="padding: 0 0.6em;" | Count
! scope="col"                                               | Of total (%)

{| class="wikitable" 
|+ Michael; 1 return
|-
! scope="col" colspan=2 rowspan=2 style="width:12em;"       | Party
! scope="col" rowspan=2           style="width:14em;"       | Candidate
! scope="col" colspan=2                                     | Votes
|-
! scope="col"                     style="padding: 0 0.6em;" | Count
! scope="col"                                               | Of total (%)

{| class="wikitable" 
|+ Middle; 1 return
|-
! scope="col" colspan=2 rowspan=2 style="width:12em;"       | Party
! scope="col" rowspan=2           style="width:14em;"       | Candidate
! scope="col" colspan=2                                     | Votes
|-
! scope="col"                     style="padding: 0 0.6em;" | Count
! scope="col"                                               | Of total (%)

{| class="wikitable" 
|+ Onchan; 3 returns
|-
! scope="col" colspan=2 rowspan=2 style="width:12em;"       | Party
! scope="col" rowspan=2           style="width:14em;"       | Candidate
! scope="col" colspan=2                                     | Votes
|-
! scope="col"                     style="padding: 0 0.6em;" | Count
! scope="col"                                               | Of total (%)

{| class="wikitable" 
|+ Peel; 1 return
|-
! scope="col" colspan=2 rowspan=2 style="width:12em;"       | Party
! scope="col" rowspan=2           style="width:14em;"       | Candidate
! scope="col" colspan=2                                     | Votes
|-
! scope="col"                     style="padding: 0 0.6em;" | Count
! scope="col"                                               | Of total (%)

{| class="wikitable" 
|+ Ramsey; 2 returns
|-
! scope="col" colspan=2 rowspan=2 style="width:12em;"       | Party
! scope="col" rowspan=2           style="width:14em;"       | Candidate
! scope="col" colspan=2                                     | Votes
|-
! scope="col"                     style="padding: 0 0.6em;" | Count
! scope="col"                                               | Of total (%)

{| class="wikitable" 
|+ Rushen; 3 returns
|-
! scope="col" colspan=2 rowspan=2 style="width:12em;"       | Party
! scope="col" rowspan=2           style="width:14em;"       | Candidate
! scope="col" colspan=2                                     | Votes
|-
! scope="col"                     style="padding: 0 0.6em;" | Count
! scope="col"                                               | Of total (%)

References

Isle of Man
General
Elections in the Isle of Man
Isle of Man
Isle of Man